Harshbarger House is a historic home located at Hollins, Roanoke County, Virginia. It is a two-story dwelling consisting of a late 18th-century, stone, two-story, one-room section with an early 19th-century brick addition.  The stone section was built in 1797, and the brick section was added about 1825.  A kitchen is attached to the main house by a modern addition.

It was added to the National Register of Historic Places in 1992.

References

Houses on the National Register of Historic Places in Virginia
Houses completed in 1797
Houses in Roanoke County, Virginia
National Register of Historic Places in Roanoke County, Virginia